The Shahed 149 Gaza or , is an Iranian unmanned combat aerial vehicle (UCAV) operated by the Iranian Revolutionary Guard. It was unveiled on 21 May 2021 and named after the Gaza Strip in honor of the Palestinians' struggle against Israel amid the 2021 Israel–Palestine crisis. It was delivered to the IRGC Aerospace Force in 2022.

The Gaza drone is a high-altitude long-endurance UAV similar in size, shape and role to the American MQ-9 Reaper. It is a larger, heavier, and more capable aircraft than the earlier Shahed 129 which was similar to the MQ-1 Predator. It has a flight duration of 35 hours, a range of 2,000 km (1,200 miles), 21m wingspan, 350 km/h cruise speed and is capable of carrying 13 bombs and 500 kg of electronic equipment. It is the first Iranian UAV powered by a turboprop engine.

History 

On February 23, 2020, a defense reporter for Tasnim News posted on Twitter that Iran was developing a drone called "Shahed 149". This is the first mention of the drone.

The drone was unveiled in May 2021.

The drone passed its flight tests in April 2022 and was accepted for service the same month.

Specifications

See also

References

Shahed 149 Gaza
149
Military equipment of Iran
Unmanned aerial vehicles of Iran
Unmanned military aircraft of Iran
Aircraft manufactured in Iran
Iranian military aircraft
Single-engined pusher aircraft
High-wing aircraft
V-tail aircraft